Wiley's Well is a natural artesian well in the Colorado Desert of Southern California as well as the name of the surrounding region. It is west of Blythe, California, in Riverside County.

It is named after Palo Verde storekeeper and postmaster A.P. Wiley who, in 1907, made a shallow well deeper that was dug in 1876 by a stagecoach company which frequented the nearby Bradshaw Trail. Wiley expanded the well in the hope of attracting business to his remote desert store; it was maintained by local ranchers and cattlemen for years afterward. However, the rapidly falling water table meant a drop of the water's depth to  within a dozen years.

In 1985, the Bureau of Land Management drilled a new well  in depth to support the new Wiley's Well Campground, one of only two developed campgrounds in the Mule Mountains Long-Term Visitor Area.  The water is both hot at 90 °F/32 °C and heavily mineralized; it is pumped into a cistern to help cool it to a temperature suitable for drinking.

Wiley's Well is also a popular rockhounding site, beginning in the 1930s with the discovery of geode beds. Despite its popularity over the decades, the area remains rich with chalcedony, citrine, quartz crystals, rhyolite and jasper. Though winters are mild, making the campground a popular destination with seasonal visitors from colder climes, summer can be extremely hot with recorded temperatures as high as 130 °F (54 °C).

Notes

External links and references 
Wiley's Well Campground, Bureau of Land Management
Wiley's Well Rest Area, California Department of Transportation
Article about Wiley's Well by Delmer G. Ross of La Sierra University

Blythe, California
Geography of Riverside County, California
Lower Colorado River Valley
Bradshaw Trail
1907 establishments in California